The American Cinema Editors Award for Best Edited Drama Series for Non-Commercial Television is one of the annual awards given by the American Cinema Editors. It has evolved throughout the history of the American Cinema Editors Awards, narrowing it's eligibility field numerous times.
 From 1962 to 1972, the award did make any distinctions between continual series and/or miniseries or television movies, or the genres of comedy and drama. 
 In 1973, when the award became Best Edited Episode from a Television Series, which it would remain from 20 years.
 In 1993, the award starting separating series based on their running time, becoming  Best Edited One Hour Series for Television.
 In 2006, a distinction was made between commercial and non-commercial series, resulting in another split.
 In 2018, the category dropped running time distinctions, becoming Best Edited Drama Series for Non-Commercial Television.
 In 2021, the category was awarded as Best Edited Drama Series, dropping any distinction between drama series.

Winners and nominees
 † – indicates the winner of a Primetime Emmy Award.
 ‡ – indicates a nomination for a Primetime Emmy Award.

1960s
Best Edited Television Program

1970s

Best Edited Episode from a Television Series

1980s

1990s

Best Edited One-Hour Series for Television

2000s

Best Edited One-Hour Series for Non-Commercial Television

2010s

Best Edited Drama Series for Non-Commercial Television

2020s

Best Edited Drama Series

Programs with multiple awards

5 awards
 M*A*S*H (CBS)

3 awards
 The Sopranos (HBO)

2 awards
 The Big Valley (ABC)
 Chicago Hope (CBS)
 The Dick Powell Show (NBC)
 ER (NBC)
 Game of Thrones (HBO)
 Hill Street Blues (NBC)
 Homeland (Showtime)
 Medical Center (CBS)
 St. Elsewhere (NBC)

Programs with multiple nominations

10 nominations
 M*A*S*H (CBS)

7 nominations
 Game of Thrones (HBO)*
 The Sopranos (HBO)*

5 nominations
 Chicago Hope (CBS)
 Hill Street Blue (NBC)
 Homeland (Showtime)*

4 nominations
 Cagney & Lacey (CBS)
 Dexter (Showtime)*
 Lou Grant (CBS)
 The West Wing (NBC)

3 nominations
 24 (Fox)
 The Big Valley (ABC)
 Cheers (NBC)
 ER (NBC)
 House of Cards (Netflix)*
 Ironside (NBC)
 L.A. Law (NBC)
 Northern Exposure (CBS)
 St. Elsewhere (NBC)
 Stranger Things (Netflix)*

2 nominations
 Bewitched (ABC)
 Boardwalk Empire (HBO)*
 Bonanza (NBC)
 Dallas (CBS)
 Deadwood (HBO)
 The Dick Powell Show (NBC)
 The Eleventh Hour (NBC)
 Euphoria (HBO)
 Gunsmoke (CBS)
 Hawaii Five-O (CBS)
 The High Chaparral (NBC)
 In the Heat of the Night (NBC)
 I Spy (NBC)
 Medical Center (CBS)
 NYPD Blue (ABC)
 Ozark (Netflix)
 Police Story (NBC)
 Rawhide (CBS)
 The Streets of San Francisco (ABC)
 True Blood (HBO)*
 True Detective (HBO)*
 Wagon Train (NBC)
 The Waltons (CBS)
 Westworld (HBO)*
 The X-Files (Fox)

References

External links
 

American Cinema Editors Awards